Si Tu No Estas (If You're Not Here) is the fourth studio album by American Tejano music singer-songwriter Pete Astudillo. The album peaked at number 37 on the US Billboard Top Latin Albums chart. The title track is a tribute song to Selena, who was shot and killed on March 31, 1995, this is the second tribute song for the singer following "Como Te Extraño" (1995). Astudillo was a backup dancer and singer for her group Selena y Los Dinos. The title track was intended for the 1997 film soundtrack of Selena, but was shelved. "Si Tu No Estas" was nominated for Song of the Year at the 1998 Tejano Music Awards, while "No Le Niego" was nominated for Tejano Crossover Song of the Year.

Track listing 
Credits adapted from the liner notes of Si Tu No Estas.

Charts

See also 

 1997 in Latin music
 Latin American music in the United States

References

Works cited 

1997 albums
Spanish-language albums
Pete Astudillo albums
EMI Latin albums
Albums produced by A.B. Quintanilla
Albums recorded at Q-Productions